St John's Church is the Church of England parish church of the village of Little Gidding in Cambridgeshire. It is dedicated to St John the Evangelist and is a Grade I listed building. It is brick with a Ketton stone (a form of limestone) facing and a Collyweston stone slate roof.

History
The earliest known building on the site was a medieval one with associations to the Knights Templar which was decaying by the 17th century but restored by Nicholas Ferrar and his family when they founded their religious community in the village at that date. Mary Ferrar had the church panelled with oak wainscoting, some of which survives on the south side of the present church's chancel. They installed an organ in March 1631–32 (now lost). Mistress Ferrar also donated the surviving brass font of c.1625 and the 15th-century brass lectern with eagle, while the current cedar communion table also dates from the Ferrars' occupancy.

That church was replaced by the present one in 1714 with a nave 8 feet shorter than its predecessor and removing the west gallery the Ferrars had installed. It was in its turn restored and altered in 1853.

On the south side of the chancel is a late 19th-century vestry which is a little larger than one half the width of the chancel.

Although photographs taken during the 1900s show an organ within the church, a 1999 survey for the National Pipe Organ Register stated that as of 1999, there was no pipe organ in this church.

An Order in Council  published in the London Gazette on 13 March 1923, combined the United Benefice of Great Gidding with Little Gidding with the Benefice of Steeple Gidding.

St John's is listed in Simon Jenkins' England's Thousand Best Churches.

See also

  Anglican religious order
  George Herbert
  Leighton Bromswold
  Little Gidding (poem)
  Saints in Anglicanism

References

External links

Friends of Little Gidding
The Giddings, the website for the villages of Great Gidding, Little Gidding and Steeple Gidding
Little Gidding, Cambridgeshire from a blog by James P. Miller (with photographs)
St John's Church, Little Gidding
Small Pilgrim Places Network; Little Gidding
Records of St John the Evangelist, Little Gidding. Inventory of materials at the Cambridgeshire County Record Office, Huntingdon, United Kingdom

Videos
 Little Gidding–St John's Church October 2013
 A Visit to Little Gidding
 Extracts from 'Little Gidding' - the poem by T S Eliot - read in Little Gidding

Anglican orders and communities
Anglican pilgrimage sites
Church of England church buildings in Cambridgeshire
Grade I listed churches in Cambridgeshire
Little Gidding
17th century in England
1626 establishments in England
1657 disestablishments
1650s disestablishments in England
1620s in England
1630s in England
1640s in England
1650s in England